Zak is a surname. It can be related to both Żak, a Polish surname, and Žák, a Czech surname. However in the case of Jews, it can be a variant of the German surname Sachs, the patronymic variant of the Hebrew biblical male personal name Yitzchak/Isaac or it can originate in the acronym surname Za'K, which stands for the Hebrew words Zera Kodesh, literally meaning Holy Seed, a quotation from Isaiah 6:13 implying descent from martyrs. In the variant Zaks, the final letter of the acronym can make the phrase Zera Kodesh Shemo ("his name descends from martyrs") or it may refer to the town of martyrdom, such as Speyer (Zera Kodesh Speyer)  or Stendal.

Notable people with the surname include:

 Anna Zak (born 2001), Israeli social media personality, model, and singer
 Eugeniusz Zak (1884–1926), Belarusian artist also known as Eugene Zak
 Frankie Zak (1922-1972), American Major League baseball player
 Fyodor Zak (born 1949), Russian mathematician
 Gershon Zak (1913-1989), Commander of the Israeli Navy
 John C. Zak (born 1954), American director, producer and filmmaker
 Leocadia I. Zak, Director of the U.S. Trade and Development Agency beginning 2009
 Paul J. Zak (born 1962), American neuroeconomist
 Peter Zak (born 1965), American jazz pianist and composer

Fictional characters
 Piotr Zak, a fictional 'Polish composer' who featured in a famous BBC broadcasting hoax in 1961
 Rowena "Randy" Zak, a pre-teenage girl from the Girl Talk (books) series

See also
Żak, Polish surname
Žák, Czech surname

References

Yiddish-language surnames
Polish-language surnames
Czech-language surnames